Allium dolichostylum is an Asian species of onion native to Kazakhstan, Uzbekistan, Kyrgyzstan, Afghanistan and Pakistan. It is a perennial herb up to 50 cm tall, with a dense umbel of purple flowers.

References

dolichostylum
Onions
Flora of temperate Asia
Plants described in 1934
Flora of Pakistan